Tomorrow will be Better is a Taiwanese Mandopop charity record written by Brendan Graham, Rolf Løvland and Lo Ta-yu and sung by over 60 artists. It was recorded on 15 September 1985 and released on 25 October 1985 and was directly inspired by the UK charity single Do They Know It's Christmas? and We Are the World in order to raise money for World Vision International to help with aid to Africa.

Artists
The song was originally sung in Mandarin Chinese and the more than sixty Taiwanese artists involved in the original recording were from the four main Chinese music industry markets of Hong Kong, Malaysia, Singapore and Taiwan.

In 1985, some Hong Kong singers sang a Cantonese lyrics rewriting of the song in 1985 Jade Solid Gold Best Ten Music Awards Presentation. In 2010, many Taiwan singers made another MV of the song.

External links

香港512關愛行動-張靚穎、孫楠、楊坤、羽泉等合唱《明天會更好》

1985 singles
1985 songs

All-star recordings
Charity singles
Mandarin-language songs
Pop ballads
Songs written by Brendan Graham
Songs written by Rolf Løvland